Julia Ho (born July 1, 1987) is an American professional wrestler and former mixed martial artist, better known by her ring name Zeda Zhang. In the past she was signed with WWE NXT and Major League Wrestling (MLW), where she was the first female wrestler signed to the promotion.

She previously was signed to WWE, where she appeared on the NXT brand under the ring name Zeda. She competed in the first Mae Young Classic in 2017 during her time with WWE.

Mixed martial arts career
Ho made her mixed martial arts (MMA) debut on July 2, 2011, defeating Betty Huck via unanimous decision. Ho fought her second and final MMA fight on October 27, 2012, defeating Evie Johnson in the second round via submission by rear naked choke.

Professional wrestling career

WWE (2017–2018) 
Ho made her debut for WWE on the NXT brand on May 13, 2017, as part of a battle royal at a house show in Dade City, Florida, wrestling under her real name.

In July, Ho competed in the first Mae Young Classic under the ring name Zeda. She lost in the first round of the tournament to eventual runner-up Shayna Baszler.

She wrestled on house shows and occasionally on the brand's television program, WWE NXT, until her release on June 2, 2018.

Oriental Wrestling Entertainment (2018–2019) 

After she was released from WWE, Zeda began working with Oriental Wrestling Entertainment, where she began training with Cima.

Major League Wrestling (2019) 

On October 2, 2019, it was announced that Ho had signed a multi-year deal with Major League Wrestling (MLW) under the ring name Zeda Zhang, becoming the promotion's first member of their new women's division. Zeda Zhang would make her MLW debut defeating The Spider Lady, who would later be revealed as Priscilla Kelly, by DQ on MLW Fusion 85.

All Elite Wrestling (2021–2022) 

On August 10, 2021, Zeda Zhang made her All Elite Wrestling (AEW) debut against Thunder Rosa on AEW Dark in a losing effort. 

On March 6, 2022, she wrestled for AEW again, this time against Toni Storm on AEW Dark in a losing effort.

References

External links 
 

1987 births
21st-century American women
21st-century professional wrestlers
American female professional wrestlers
Living people
Entertainers from Virginia
American female mixed martial artists
American people of Chinese descent
American professional wrestlers of Asian descent